Rupert Thomas (November 21, 1890 – February 28, 1956) was an American sprinter. He competed in the men's 100 metres at the 1912 Summer Olympics.

References

1890 births
1956 deaths
Athletes (track and field) at the 1912 Summer Olympics
American male sprinters
Olympic track and field athletes of the United States
Track and field athletes from Kansas City, Missouri